Adolf Eichmann (1906–1962) was a German Nazi leader and Holocaust perpetrator.

Eichmann may also refer to:
 Eichmann (film), a 2007 film

People with the surname
 Eric Eichmann (born 1965), American soccer player
 Léo Eichmann (born 1936), Swiss football (soccer) goalkeeper
Ricardo Eichmann (born 1955), German archeologist and son of Adolf Eichmann

See also 
 Eichmann in Jerusalem, a 1963 book
 Eichmann Interrogated, a 1983 book
 United States v. Eichman, a 1990 United States Supreme Court case that invalidated a federal law against flag desecration

German-language surnames